Pratt House is a historic home located at Elmira, Chemung County, New York.  It is a large scale brick dwelling in the Italianate style.  It has a cross-gable plan and features two asymmetrical towers, a projecting polygonal bay, and a stepped back, Arts and Crafts style north wing. The lower tower has a pyramidal roof and the taller tower a bell cast roof embellished with cresting.  It was originally located on Union Place, but moved to its present location in 1872 when it was extensively remodeled to its present appearance.  The rear wing was added in the 1920s when it was home to the Elmira Eagles Aerie 941.

It was listed on the National Register of Historic Places in 2008.

References

Houses on the National Register of Historic Places in New York (state)
Italianate architecture in New York (state)
Houses in Chemung County, New York
Buildings and structures in Elmira, New York
National Register of Historic Places in Chemung County, New York